The Puy Mary is a summit in the mounts of Cantal in Massif Central in France. It is classified as a "Grand National Site" in France. Nearly 500,000 visitors come to this site every year.

Geography and geology

The mountain is an extinct volcano, about 6.5 million years old, which was formed by the accumulation of viscous lava (trachyte). It has been gradually eroded by glaciers during the Quaternary glaciation, which explains its pyramidal form. Seven glacial valleys radiate from the summit. It is accessible starting from the Pas de Peyrol, which at 1,589 m above sea level, is the highest pass of the Massif Central.

Climate

First mountain met by the oceanic disturbances coming from the Atlantic Ocean, the Puy Mary is among the wettest places in France. In winter, snow is abundant.

Flora

The subalpine stage of the Cantal mounts counts 550 plant species including 130 regarded as fragile (in these species, one counts 60 species which profit from a protection regional or national and 70 other not protected but rare). For example, one will be able to find, with a little chance, the following species of high mountain : the saxifrage with opposite sheets (Saxifraga oppositifolia), the saxifrage with sheets of Androsace (Saxifraga androsacea), the verticillate pedicular (Pedicularis verticillata) or the saxifrage of Lamotte (Saxifraga exarata subsp lamottei), the latter being an endemic species of the Cantal and the monts Dore. The puy Mary is a top where most of this flora can be observed.

References

 
Volcanoes of Metropolitan France